In psychology, grandiosity is a nonnormative sense of superiority, uniqueness, or invulnerability. It may be expressed by exaggerated beliefs regarding one's abilities, the belief that few other people have anything in common with oneself, and that one can only be understood by a few, very special people. The personality trait of grandiosity is principally associated with narcissistic personality disorder (NPD), but also is a feature in the occurrence and expression of antisocial personality disorder, and the manic and hypomanic episodes of bipolar disorder.

Measurement
Few scales exist for the sole purpose of measuring grandiosity, though one recent attempt is the Narcissistic Grandiosity Scale (NGS), an adjective rating scale where one indicates the applicability of a word to oneself (e.g. superior, glorious).

Grandiosity is also measured as part of other tests, including the Personality Assessment for DSM-5 (PID-5), Psychopathy Checklist-Revised, and diagnostic interviews for NPD. The Grandiosity section of the Diagnostic Interview for Narcissism (DIN), for instance, describes:

 The person exaggerates talents, capacity, and achievements in an unrealistic way.
 The person believes in their invulnerability or does not recognize their limitations.
 The person has grandiose fantasies.
 The person believes that they do not need other people.
 The person overexamines and downgrades other people's projects, statements, or dreams in an unrealistic manner.
 The person regards themself as unique or special when compared to other people.
 The person regards themself as generally superior to other people.
 The person behaves self-centeredly and/or self-referentially.
 The person behaves in a boastful or pretentious way.

In narcissism
Grandiose narcissism is a subtype of narcissism with grandiosity as its central feature. Contrary to popular misconception even among psychologists, grandiose narcissism and "narcissistic grandiosity" are not interchangeable terms, with the latter referring to the subject of this article and the former referring to a type narcissism defined by grandiosity as well as social dominance, interpersonal exploitativeness, entitlement, disdainfulness, superficial charm, attention-seeking, and agentic extraversion.

In mania
In mania, grandiosity is typically more pro-active and aggressive than in narcissism. The manic character may boast of future achievements or exaggerate their personal qualities.

They may also begin unrealistically ambitious undertakings, before being cut down, or cutting themselves back down, to size.

In psychopathy
Grandiosity features in Factor 1, Facet 1 (Interpersonal) in the Hare Psychopathy Checklist-Revised (PCL-R) test. Individuals endorsing this criterion appear arrogant and boastful, and may be unrealistically optimistic about their future. The American Psychiatric Association's DSM-5 also notes that persons with antisocial personality disorder often display an inflated self-image, and can appear excessively self-important, opinionated and cocky, and often hold others in contempt.

Relationship with other variables

Grandiosity is well documented to have associations with both positive/adaptive and negative/maladaptive outcomes, leading some researchers to question whether it is necessarily pathological.

Positive/Adaptive 

Grandiosity demonstrates moderate-to-strong positive correlations with self-esteem, typically becoming larger in size when controlling for confounding variables. It relates positively to self-rated superiority and is inversely associated with self-rated worthlessness. It is also associated with a host of other variables (often even when controlling for self-esteem), including positive affect, optimism, life satisfaction, behavioural activation system functioning, and all forms of emotional resilience. It also correlates positively with adaptive narcissism, namely authoritativeness, charisma, self-assurance and ambitiousness. Moreover, it exhibits negative associations with depression, anxiety, pessimism and shame. Grandiosity has a small positive relationship with intelligence and achievement.

Negative/Maladaptive 

Grandiosity has a well-studied association with aggression (both physical and verbal), risk-taking (e.g. financial, social, sexual) and competitiveness. It also has reliable associations with maladaptive narcissistic traits like entitlement and interpersonal exploitativeness. Even when controlling for exploitativeness, however, grandiosity still predicts unethical behaviours like lying, cheating and stealing. Grandiosity seems to be specifically related to rationalised cheating (i.e. opportunistic cheating behaviour whose context allows the behaviour to be construed as something other than cheating), but not deliberative cheating (i.e. conscious premeditation to violate rules and cheat).

Mechanisms

Despite the prominence of grandiosity in the research literature, few theories or even studies of its underlying mechanisms exist. Approximately 23% of the variance in grandiosity is explained by genetics, with the majority of remaining variance attributable to non-shared environmental factors.

Cognitive 

Research has consistently indicated a role of positive rumination (repetitive positive self-focused thoughts). Recently, an experimental study found that having neurotypical participants engage in overly-positive rumination (i.e. think about times when they felt special, unique, important or superior) lead to increases in state grandiosity, whereas a control distraction condition conferred no such increment. Another study confirmed that positive ruminations confer grandiose self-perceptions in the moment, and found that (grandiosity-prone) patients with bipolar disorder (compared with healthy controls) exhibited heightened connectivity between brain regions associated with self-relevant information-processing during this task (medial prefrontal and anterior cingulate cortices) Further, experimental studies suggest that grandiose narcissists maintain their inflated self-esteem following criticism by recalling self-aggrandizing memories.

Correlational designs further confirm the associations of mania/hypomania and grandiose narcissism with positive self-rumination, and to specific expressions of positive rumination after success (e.g. believing that success in one domain indicates likely success in another). Grandiose fantasies, conceptually similar to positive rumination, also feature in narcissism. While grandiose narcissism has been associated with attentional and mnemonic biases to positive self-related words, it remains to be seen whether this reflects grandiosity or some other trait specific to narcissism (e.g. entitlement).

Other theories 

A common characteristic of disorders and traits associated with grandiosity is heightened positive affect and potential dysregulation thereof. This is true of mania/hypomania in bipolar disorder, grandiose narcissism, and the interpersonal facet of psychopathy. Such associations partially inspired the Narcissism Spectrum Model, which posits grandiosity reflects the combination of self-preoccupation and "boldness" - exaggerated positive emotionality, self-confidence, and reward-seeking, which is ostensibly linked with neurobiological systems mediating behavioural approach motivation.

While no neuroimaging studies have specifically assessed the association between grandiosity and the reward system (or any other system), some neuroimaging studies using composite scales of grandiosity with other traits offer tentative support of these assertions, while others using the same measure suggest no association.

Contrary to frequent assertions by narcissism researchers, and despite much study of the matter, there is only weak and inconsistent evidence that grandiosity (when specifically and reliably measured) and grandiose narcissism have any association with parental overvaluation. The largest study on the matter found no association whatsoever.

Reality-testing

A distinction is made between individuals exhibiting grandiosity which includes a degree of insight into their unrealistic thoughts (they are aware that their behavior is considered unusual), and those experiencing grandiose delusions who lack this capability for reality-testing. Some individuals may transition between these two states, with grandiose ideas initially developing as "daydreams" that the patient recognises as untrue, but which can subsequently turn into full delusions that the patient becomes convinced reflect reality.

Psychoanalysis and the grandiose self

Otto Kernberg saw the unhealthily grandiose self as merging childhood feelings of specialness, personal ideals, and fantasies of an ideal parent.

Heinz Kohut saw the grandiose self as a normal part of the developmental process, only pathological when the grand and humble parts of the self became decisively divided. Kohut's recommendations for dealing with the patient with a disordered grandiose self were to tolerate and so re-integrate the grandiosity with the realistic self.

Reactive attachment disorder

The personality trait of grandiosity also is a component of the reactive attachment disorder (RAD), a severe and relatively uncommon attachment disorder that affects children. The expression of RAD is characterized by markedly disturbed and developmentally inappropriate ways of relating to other people in most social contexts, such as the persistent failure to initiate or to respond to most social interactions in a developmentally appropriate way, known as the "inhibited form" of reactive attachment disorder.

Related traits
Grandiosity is associated and often confused with other personality traits, including self-esteem, entitlement, and contemptuousness.

Self-esteem While the exact difference between high self-esteem and grandiosity has yet to be fully elucidated, research suggests that, while strongly correlated, they predict different outcomes. While both predict positive outcomes like optimism, life and job satisfaction, extraversion and positive affect, grandiosity uniquely predicts entitlement, exploitativeness and aggression.

Entitlement Entitlement is regularly confused with grandiosity even in peer-reviewed articles, but the literature nevertheless offers a clear discrimination of the two. Psychological entitlement is a sense of deservingness to positive outcomes, and can be founded on either grandiosity or feelings of deprivation. Like self-esteem, grandiosity and entitlement are well documented to predict different outcomes. Entitlement appears to be associated with more maladaptive outcomes, including low empathy, antisocial behaviour, and poor mental health, whereas grandiosity predicts better mental health.

Devaluation/contempt Surprisingly, and quite counterintuitively, grandiosity is actually completely uncorrelated with regarding others as worthless. Moreover, grandiosity should not be conflated with arrogant social behaviour.

See also

References 

Symptoms and signs of mental disorders